"Big Boss Man" is a blues song first recorded by Jimmy Reed in 1960.  It became one of his most popular songs, although the songwriting is credited to Luther Dixon and Al Smith. Chicago-based Vee-Jay Records released it as a single, which became one of Reed's last appearances on the record charts. The song has been recorded by artists in diverse styles, including Elvis Presley, B.B. King, and Hope Sandoval, who also had chart successes with the song.

Original song
"Big Boss Man" is an uptempo twelve-bar blues shuffle that features "one of the most influential Reed grooves of all time".  It is credited to Jimmy Reed's manager, Al Smith, and Vee-Jay Records staff writer Luther Dixon. The song is one of the few Reed hits that was written by someone other than Reed and his wife. Reed recorded the song in Chicago on March 29, 1960; backing Reed, who sang and played harmonica and guitar, are Mamma Reed on vocal, Lee Baker and Lefty Bates on guitars, Willie Dixon on bass, and Earl Phillips on drums.

"Big Boss Man" was originally released on Jimmy Reed's 1960 album Found Love. In 1961, Vee-Jay Records released it as a single, which reached number 13 on Billboards R&B Hot Sides chart and number 78 on its Hot 100 chart.

Legacy
In 1990, the song was inducted into the Blues Foundation Hall of Fame. In its induction statement, blues historian Jim O'Neal noted that  the song's appeal went beyond blues musicians and:

The Rock and Roll Hall of Fame included it in its 1995 list of the "500 Songs That Shaped Rock and Roll". 

As one of Reed's best-known songs, "Big Boss Man" has been recorded by numerous artists. In 1967, a version by Elvis Presley that reached number 38 on the Billboard Hot 100 singles chart.  He performed the song as part of a medley during the Elvis 1968 Comeback Special. In their early days, "Big Boss Man" was part of the Grateful Dead's concert repertoire.  It was usually sung by Ron "Pigpen" McKernan, who also provided blues-style harmonica accompaniment. According to group chronicler David Malvinni, McKernan's "powerful voice" was well-suited to deliver convincing renditions of older blues songs, compared to vocals by other blues revival bands. A live recording first appeared on their 1971 self-titled album.

B.B. King recorded the song for his 1985 album Six Silver Strings. Released on a single by MCA Records, his rendition reached number 62 on Billboards Hot Black singles chart. Hope Sandoval recorded the song for Mercury Rev's 2019 album Bobbie Gentry's The Delta Sweete Revisited. An album review noted: "Hope Sandoval takes 'Big Boss Man' in just the way you'd want and expect Hope Sandoval to take 'Big Boss Man'like it's an old Velvet Underground ballad she's just heard."

References

1960 songs
Blues songs
Songs written by Luther Dixon
1961 singles
Jimmy Reed songs
1967 singles
Elvis Presley songs
1985 singles
B.B. King songs
Vee-Jay Records singles